Zahmani (also Romanized as Zaḩmānī; also known as Zamāni) is a village in Horr Rural District, Dinavar District, Sahneh County, Kermanshah Province, Iran. At the 2006 census, its population was 220, in 45 families.

References 

Populated places in Sahneh County